Hartmann "Harti" Weirather (born January 25, 1958)  is a former World Cup alpine ski racer from Austria. Born in Reutte, Tyrol, he specialized in the downhill event.

Racing career
During the early 1980s, Weirather won six World Cup downhill races and won the downhill at the 1982 World Championships in Schladming, Austria. In addition, he won the World Cup season title in downhill in 1981.

Weirather's win at Kitzbühel in 1982 was the first-ever under two minutes on the full-length Streif course; his time (1:57.20) stood as the course record for ten years. (The two downhill races at Kitzbühel in 1982 were extremely fast compared to previous years; Weirather broke Franz Klammer's 1975 record (2:03.22) by over six seconds, and the top 15 finishers in both races were all under two minutes.)

Personal
Weirather is married to former World Cup champion Hanni Wenzel of Liechtenstein. They run a business consultancy firm in Planken, Liechtenstein, and their daughter, Tina Weirather, is a former world junior champion and competes on the World Cup circuit for Liechtenstein.

World Cup results

Season titles

Season standings

Race podiums
6 wins - (6 DH)
17 podiums - (17 DH)

World championship results 

From 1948 through 1980, the Winter Olympics were also the World Championships for alpine skiing.

Olympic results

References

External links
 
 Harti Weirather World Cup standings at the International Ski Federation 
 
 
 

Austrian male alpine skiers
1958 births
Living people
FIS Alpine Ski World Cup champions
Alpine skiers at the 1980 Winter Olympics
Olympic alpine skiers of Austria
Recipients of the Decoration of Honour for Services to the Republic of Austria
People from Reutte District
Sportspeople from Tyrol (state)